2-Bromopropane, also known as isopropyl bromide and 2-propyl bromide, is the halogenated hydrocarbon with the formula CH3CHBrCH3. It is a colorless liquid. It is used for introducing the isopropyl functional group in organic synthesis. 2-Bromopropane is prepared by heating isopropanol with hydrobromic acid.

Preparation
2-Bromopropane is commercially available. It may be prepared in the ordinary manner of alkyl bromides, by reacting isopropanol with phosphorus and bromine, or with phosphorus tribromide.

Safety
Short-chain alkyl halides are often carcinogenic.

The bromine atom is at the secondary position, which allows the molecule to undergo dehydrohalogenation easily to give propene, which escapes as a gas and can rupture closed reaction vessels. When this reagent is used in base catalyzed reactions, potassium carbonate should be used in place of sodium or potassium hydroxide.

Further reading
Max Gergel, “Excuse Me Sir, Would You Like to Buy a Kilo of Isopropyl Bromide?” Pierce Chemical Co. (1979). (story of start-up chemical company).

References

Bromoalkanes
Alkylating agents
Isopropyl compounds